The South and Central American Men's Handball Championship is the official competition for senior national handball teams of South America and Central America, and takes place every two years. In addition to crowning the South and Central American champions, the tournament also serves as a qualifying tournament for the World Handball Championship. The first tournament was held in 2020 in Maringá, Brazil.

Summaries

Medal table

Participating nations

External links
Official website

 
Men's sports competitions in South America
Recurring sporting events established in 2020
South and Central America Handball Confederation competitions